Rezaul Karim may refer to:

 Rezaul Karim (scholar) (born 1971), Bangladeshi Islamic scholar and politician
 Rezaul Karim (diplomat) (1935–2005), Bangladeshi diplomat
 Rezaul Karim Hira (born 1942), Bangladesh Awami League politician
 Rezaul Karim (footballer) (born 1987), Bangladeshi footballer
 Rezaul Karim Siddique (1955–2016), Bangladeshi professor